Amade Chemane Camal Jr. (born 1954) is a Mozambican politician and entrepreneur. The CEO of Sir Comercio Internacional, and the father of leading transport businesses in Mozambique. He was a member of the Assembly of the Republic of Mozambique for Nampula Province from 1994 to 1999.

References

1956 births
Living people
Muslim activists
Members of the Assembly of the Republic (Mozambique)
People from Nampula Province
Mozambican Muslims